The women's 100 metres sprint competition of the athletics events at the 2011 Pan American Games will take place between the 24 and 25 of October at the Telmex Athletics Stadium. The defending Pan American Games champion is Mikele Barber of the United States.

Records
Prior to this competition, the existing world and Pan American Games records were as follows:

Qualification
Each National Olympic Committee (NOC) was able to enter up to two entrants providing they had met the minimum standard (11.50) in the qualifying period (January 1, 2010 to September 14, 2011).

Schedule

Results
All times shown are in seconds.

Heats
The first round scheduled for October 24 was bypassed as there were only 19 competitors entered.

Semifinals
The semifinals were held on October 24, with three semi-finals.  The first two places plus the next to best times qualified.

Final

References

Athletics at the 2011 Pan American Games
2011
2011 in women's athletics